The History of French foreign relations covers French diplomacy and foreign relations down to 1980.  For the more recent developments, see Foreign relations of France.

Valois and Bourbon France 1453–1789

Franco-Ottoman alliance
The Franco-Ottoman alliance was a military  alliance established in 1536 between the king of France Francis I and the Sultan of the Ottoman Empire Suleiman the Magnificent. The strategic and sometimes tactical alliance was one of the most important foreign alliances of France, and was particularly influential during the Italian Wars.  It enabled France to fight the Holy Roman Empire under Charles V and Philip II on equal terms. The Franco-Ottoman military alliance reached its peak around 1553 during the reign Henry II of France. The alliance was exceptional, as the first alliance between a Christian and Muslim state, and caused a scandal in the Christian world, especially since France was heavily committed to support Catholicism. Carl Jacob Burckhardt called it "the sacrilegious union of the lily and the crescent". It lasted intermittently for more than two and a half centuries, until the Napoleonic invasion of Ottoman Egypt, in 1798–1801.

Louis XIV and Louis XV
Under the long reigns of kings Louis XIV (1643–1715) and Louis XV (1715–1774), France was second in size to Russia but first in terms of economic and military power. It fought numerous expensive wars, usually to protect its voice in the selection of monarchs in neighboring countries.  A high priority was blocking the growth of power of the Habsburg rivals who controlled Austria and Spain.

Warfare defined the foreign policies of Louis XIV, and his personality shaped his approach.  Impelled "by a mix of commerce, revenge, and pique", Louis sensed that warfare was the ideal way to enhance his glory. In peacetime he concentrated on preparing for the next war. He taught his diplomats their job was to create tactical and strategic advantages for the French military.
 Young, Robert J. In Command of France: French Foreign Policy and Military Planning, 1933–1940 (1978)
 Young, Robert J. French Foreign Policy 1918–1945: A Guide to Research and Research Materials (2nd ed. Scholarly Resources, 1991) 339 pp. Historiography
 Zahniser, Marvin R. Then Came Disaster: France and the United States, 1918–1940 (2002)

Relations with Great Britain

  Alexander, Martin S. and William J. Philpott. Anglo-French Defence Relations Between the Wars (2003), 1919–39 excerpt and text search
 Bell, Philip J. France and Britain, 1900–1940. Entente and Estrangement (Longman, 1996)
Bell, P.M.H.  France and Britain, 1940–1994: The Long Separation (1997) 
 Chassaigne, Philippe, and Michael Lawrence Dockrill, eds. Anglo-French Relations 1898–1998: From Fashoda to Jospin (Palgrave, 2002) essays by scholars
 Gibson, Robert. The Best of Enemies: Anglo-French Relations Since the Norman Conquest (2nd ed. 2011) major scholarly study excerpt and text search
 Johnson, Douglas, et al.  Britain and France: Ten Centuries (1980) table of contents
  Philpott, William James. Anglo-French Relations and Strategy on the Western Front 1914–18 (1996) 
 Pickles, Dorothy. The Uneasy Entente. French Foreign Policy and Franco-British Misunderstandings (1966)
 Sharp, Alan, and Glyn Stone. Anglo-French Relations in the Twentieth Century: Rivalry and Cooperation (2000) excerpt and text search
 Wright, Alan H. The Fashoda affair: A study in the age of imperialism (1951).

Relations with United States

 Bailey, Thomas A. A Diplomatic History of the American People (10th edition 1980) online free to borrow.
 Belkin, Paul. France: Factors shaping foreign policy and issues in US-French relations (Diane Publishing, 2012).
 Berthon, Simon.  Allies at War: The Bitter Rivalry among Churchill, Roosevelt, and de Gaulle. (2001). 356 pp.
 Blackburn, George M. French Newspaper Opinion on the American Civil War (1997) 
 Blumenthal, Henry. A Reappraisal of Franco-American Relations, 1830-1871 (1959).
 Blumenthal, Henry. France and the United States: Their Diplomatic Relations, 1789–1914 (1979)  excerpt and text search; online free to borrow
 Blumenthal, Henry. Illusion and Reality in Franco-American Diplomacy, 1914–1945 (1986)
 Bowman, Albert H. The Struggle for Neutrality: Franco-American Diplomacy during the Federalist Era (1974), on 1790s.
 Bozo, Frédéric. "'Winners' and 'Losers': France, the United States, and the End of the Cold War," Diplomatic History Nov. 2009, Volume 33, Issue 5, pages 927–956, 
 Brogi, Alessandro. Confronting America: the cold war between the United States and the communists in France and Italy (2011).
 Brookhiser, Richard. "France and Us." American Heritage (Aug/Sep 2003) 54#4 pp 28–33. wide-ranging survey over 250 years
 Bush, Robert D. The Louisiana Purchase: A Global Context (2013).
 Case, Lynn Marshall, and Warren F. Spencer. The United States and France: Civil War Diplomacy (1970)
 Cogan, Charles. Oldest Allies, Guarded Friends: The United States and France Since 1940 (1994) 
 Costigliola, Frank. France and the United States: the cold alliance since World War II (1992), Scholarly history.
 Creswell, Michael. A Question of Balance: How France and the United States Created Cold War Europe (Harvard Historical Studies) (2006)  excerpt and text search
 Duroselle, Jean-Baptiste. "Relations between Two Peoples: The Singular Example of the United States and France," Review of Politics (1979) 41#4 pp. 483–500 in JSTOR, by leading French diplomatic historian
 Duroselle, Jean-Baptiste. France and the United States from the beginnings to the present (1978) online free to borrow
 Feske, Victor H. "The Road To Suez: The British Foreign Office and the Quai D’Orsay, 1951–1957" in The Diplomats, 1939-1979 (2019) Pp. 167-200; online
 Hill, Peter P. Napoleon's Troublesome Americans: Franco-American Relations, 1804-1815 (2005). online free to borrow
 Hoffman, Ronald and Peter J. Albert, eds. Diplomacy and Revolution: The Franco-American Alliance of 1778 (1981), Topical essays by scholars.
 Hurstfield, Julian G. America and the French Nation, 1939–1945 (1986). replaces Langer's 1947 study of FDR and Vichy France
 King, Richard Carl, "Review of the historiography of Franco-American relations from 1828-1860" (1972). (U. of Montana Graduate Student Theses, Dissertations, & Professional Papers. 5199) online
 Langer, William l.  Our Vichy Gamble (1947), defends FDR's policy 1940-42
 McLaughlin, Sean J. JFK and de Gaulle: How America and France Failed in Vietnam, 1961-1963 (UP of Kentucky, 2019)DOI:10.5810/kentucky/9780813177748.001.0 
 Meunier, Sophie. "Is France Still Relevant?." French Politics, Culture & Society 35.2 (2017): 59-75.
 Morris, Richard B. The Peacemakers; the Great Powers and American Independence (1965), the standard scholarly history
 Morris, Richard B.  "The Great Peace of 1783," Massachusetts Historical Society Proceedings (1983) Vol. 95, pp 29–51, a summary of his long book in JSTOR
 Noble, George. Policies and opinions at Paris, 1919: Wilsonian diplomacy, the Versailles Peace, and French public opinion (1968).
 Pagedas, Constantine A. Anglo-American Strategic Relations and the French Problem, 1960-1963: A Troubled Partnership (2000).
 Paxton, Robert O., ed. De Gaulle and the United States (1994)
 Reyn, Sebastian. Atlantis Lost: The American Experience with De Gaulle, 1958–1969 (2011)
 Sainlaude Stève, France and the American Civil War: a diplomatic history (2019) DOI:10.5149/northcarolina/9781469649948.001.0001
 Sainlaude Stève, France and the Confederacy (1861–1865), Paris, L'Harmattan, 2011
 Statler, Kathryn C.  Replacing France: The Origins of American Intervention in Vietnam (2007)
 Stinchcombe, William C. The American Revolution and the French Alliance (1969)
 Viorst, Milton. Hostile Allies: FDR and de Gaulle (Macmillan, 1965)
 Wall, Irwin M. The United States and the Making of Postwar France, 1945-1954 (1991).
 Wall, Irwin M. France, the United States, and the Algerian War (2001).
 White, Elizabeth Brett. American opinion of France from Lafayette to Poincaré (1927) online
 Whitridge, Arnold. "Gouverneur Morris in France." History Today (Nov 1972), pp 759-767 online; on 1792-1794
 Williams, Andrew J. France, Britain and the United States in the Twentieth Century 1900–1940 (2014). 133-171.
 
 Willson, Beckles. America's Ambassadors to France (1777-1927): A Narrative of Franco-American Diplomatic Relations (1928).
 Young, Robert J. American by Degrees: The Extraordinary Lives of French Ambassador Jules Jusserand (2009). On the 1920s
 Zahniser, Marvin R. "The French Connection: Thirty Years of French-American Relations," Reviews in American History (1987) 15#3 pp. 486–492 in JSTOR reviews books by Blumenthal (1986) and Hurstfield (1986)
 Zahniser, Marvin R. Uncertain friendship: American-French diplomatic relations through the cold war (1975).
 Zahniser, Marvin R. "Rethinking the Significance of Disaster: The United States and the Fall of France in 1940" International History Review'' 14#2 (1992), pp. 252–276 online

External links
H-France free daily email discussions and book reviews; oriented to scholars & graduate students since 1991.